Tadeusz Góra (19 January 1918 – 4 January 2010) was a Polish glider and military pilot. Born in Kraków, Austria-Hungary he was the first winner of the Lilienthal Gliding Medal in the world for his record-breaking 577.8-kilometer flight on 18 May 1938, glider PWS-101 from Bezmiechowa to Soleczniki (near Vilnius).
For this he was the first recipient of the Lilienthal Medal awarded by the Fédération Aéronautique Internationale.

In late August 1940 Góra served with the RAF's No 2 AACU before undertaking advanced training with 61 OTU at Heston.

As a Sgt. Pilot, Góra was posted to No. 316 (Polish) Squadron, flying the Spitfire, flying his first operation on 18 November 1941, a convoy patrol.

On 10 April 1942 he claimed a Focke-Wulf Fw 190 damaged, and on 3 June 1942 he claimed a Fw 190 shot down over Le Havre.

In early 1943 Góra studied at the Infantry Cadet and Cavalry Academy in Scotland, and was promoted to Pilot Officer.

On 13 May 1943 Góra destroyed a Bf 109G and on 27 August 1943 he shot down another of this type. On 4 September 1943, while escorting a USAAF formation of B-17s near Lille, he claimed a Fw 190 damaged. After the war, following research on Luftwaffe loss data, the aircraft was identified as a Bf 109 and classified as “destroyed.”

P/O Góra was posted to No. 316 Squadron in April 1944 flying the P-51 Mustang. From June to October 1944, he destroyed two locomotives near Bremen, and damaged a German submarine.

Góra also flew  28 flights anti- V-1 “flying bombs” operations; one such bomb he destroyed on 31 July 1944.  He performed his final operational flight of his tour on 22 October 1944 over Heligoland.

During the war he flew with the RAF, serving on three Mustang-equipped Polish fighter squadrons 306, 315, 316.

After the end of the war he was discharged as a Flight Lieutenant and had been awarded the Silver Cross of Virtuti Militari Order, the Cross of Valour three times.

Tadeusz Góra returned to Poland in 1948, as a senior instructor at the Żar Glider School near Żywiec.

He died in Świdnik on 4 January 2010.

External links
  FAI announcement
  list of all FAI The Lilienthal Gliding Medal winners
 deaths notice

1918 births
2010 deaths
Polish aviators
Polish World War II pilots
Lilienthal Gliding Medal recipients
Glider pilots